Bruno Filipe Santos Loureiro (born 23 September 1989) is a Portuguese professional footballer who plays for G.D. Mangualde as a midfielder.

Club career
Born in Viseu, Loureiro started his senior career with local amateurs S.C. Penalva do Castelo. In 2012, the 23-year-old signed with neighbouring Académico de Viseu FC, helping them promote to the Segunda Liga in his first season.

Loureiro made his second division debut on 10 August 2013, playing the full 90 minutes in a 2–0 away loss against Moreirense FC. He scored his first goal as a professional on 27 November of the same year, helping the hosts defeat F.C. Penafiel 1–0. During his first spell at the Estádio do Fontelo he was voted the competition's player of the month twice, in January and February 2014.

On 25 July 2014, Loureiro moved to Pogoń Szczecin of the Polish Ekstraklasa on a one-year contract with the option for a further season. He returned to his country shortly after with no competitive appearances to his credit, going on to represent S.C. Farense and then Académico Viseu.

References

External links

1989 births
Living people
People from Viseu
Sportspeople from Viseu District
Portuguese footballers
Association football midfielders
Liga Portugal 2 players
Segunda Divisão players
Académico de Viseu F.C. players
S.C. Farense players
Lusitano FCV players
Pogoń Szczecin players
Portuguese expatriate footballers
Expatriate footballers in Poland
Portuguese expatriate sportspeople in Poland